Victor Dorin Roșca (born 24 August 1954) is a Romanian former professional footballer and manager.

Player career
As a footballer, Roșca was the goalkeeper of Divizia A teams Rapid București and Chimia Râmnicu Vâlcea. Roșca promoted with Chimia in the top-flight in 1978 and is considered one of the best goalkeepers in the history of the club. "Vicky" Roșca played in 126 matches for Chimia and scored a goal, one of the few goalkeepers that scored in the Liga I.

Manager career
Roșca retired in the late 1980s and started his manager career at Metalul Bocșa, subsequently managing second tier side Gloria Reșița. Roșca built at Gloria one of the best squads in the history of this club. As a reward for his work, Roșca was promoted in 1996 as the manager of CSM Reșița and at the end of the season he promoted "the Milan from Banat" in the Divizia A. After this performance, Roșca moved in the next years to Politehnica Timișoara, Minerul Motru and Corvinul Hunedoara, all second tier teams.

In 2000 he was signed as the new manager of Divizia A club Petrolul Ploiești, then in 2002 moved to Oțelul Galați. After 2002, Roșca never managed again in the top-flight, but was an active manager in the lower divisions and led from the bench, teams such as Inter Gaz București, UTA Arad, FCM Reșița, Arieșul Turda (second tier); AFC Filipeștii de Pădure, CS Blejoi or CS Hunedoara, among others (third and fourth tier).

In recent years, Victor Roșca was a match observer for the Romanian Football Federation.

Famous quote
In 2000, when Roșca was coach at Petrolul, at the press conference that was held before a game with Rapid București, a journalist kept insisting to ask him to reveal his tactic for the game, so Roșca said to him, ironically:"Short passes and up, you have, you don't have the ball, you shoot at the goal!".

Honours

Player
Chimia Râmnicu Vâlcea
Divizia B: Winner (1) 1977–78

Manager
CSM Reșița
Divizia B: Winner (1) 1996–97
Blejoi
Cupa României – Prahova County: Winner (1) 2011–12

References

External links
 Victor Roșca at labtof.ro

1954 births
Living people
People from Buzău County
Romanian footballers
Association football goalkeepers
Liga I players
Liga II players
FC Rapid București players
Chimia Râmnicu Vâlcea players
Romanian football managers
CSM Reșița managers
FC Politehnica Timișoara managers
CS Minerul Motru managers
FC Petrolul Ploiești managers
ASC Oțelul Galați managers
FC UTA Arad managers
CS Corvinul Hunedoara managers